The 1959 Cork Senior Football Championship was the 71st staging of the Cork Senior Football Championship since its establishment by the Cork County Board in 1887. 

Macroom entered the championship as the defending champions.

On 4 October 1959, St. Finbarr's won the championship following a 1-05 to 0-06 defeat of Macroom in the final. This was their third championship title overall and their first since 1957.

Results

Final

References

Cork Senior Football Championship